Fei Wo Si Cun (born 26 December 1978) is the pen name of the Chinese writer Ai Jingjing. She was born in Wuhan, Hubei, China. She has published 18 novels, 10 of which have been adapted into TV series. She once used names Si Cun and Fei Xiaocun. Her representatives are Too Late to Say I Love You, Romantic Holidays Like Dreams and Siege in Fog.

Works published
Crack Brocade 《裂锦》
Lonely courtyard in late spring 《寂寞空庭春欲晚》
Too late to say I love you 《来不及说我爱你》
If I do not meet you at this moment 《如果这一秒，我没有遇见你》
Romantic Holidays Like Dreams 《佳期如梦》
Cold Moon Like Frost 《冷月如霜》
Moon at moment 《当时明月在》
Fragrant Coldness 《香寒》
This Life 《今生今世》
Variety Flowers At seaside 《海上繁花》
Peach still laughing at spring breeze 《桃花依旧笑春风》
Don't know when it is 《景年知几时》
Mountains covered by snow in evenings 《千山暮雪》
Dong Gong 《东宫》
Flowers' smiles 《花颜》
Bright 《明媚》
Bright stars 《星光璀璨》
Siege in fog 《迷雾》

Drama adaptations
The Girl in Blue (2010)
Too Late to Say Loving You (2010)
 Sealed with a Kiss (2011) 
Chronicle of Life (2016)
Siege in Fog (2018)
Goodbye My Princess (2019) 
Tears in Heaven (2019)

References

External linksink 
Fei Wo Si Cun official website 

Living people
Writers from Wuhan
1978 births
Chinese women novelists
People's Republic of China novelists
21st-century Chinese novelists
21st-century Chinese women writers